The Kansas City Area Transportation Authority (KCATA) is a public transit agency in metropolitan Kansas City. It operates the Metro Area Express (MAX) bus rapid transit service in Kansas City, Missouri, and 78 local bus routes in seven counties of Missouri and Kansas.

The KCATA is a bi-state agency formed by an interstate compact between Kansas and Missouri in 1965–6. Authorized by both states' legislatures and an act of Congress, the agency's jurisdiction includes Cass, Clay, Jackson and Platte counties in Missouri and Johnson, Leavenworth and Wyandotte counties in Kansas. The agency is governed by a board of ten commissioners, five from each state. Operations began in 1969, when the KCATA took over bus routes previously run by the Kansas City Public Service Company.

In 2014, KCATA, Johnson County Transit, UG Transit and IndeBus announced that all services would be merged into one service, RideKC by 2019.  The Johnson County, KS Commissioners pulled out of KCATA management agreement effective August 1, 2022 but retained the partnership with the regional RideKC transit branding and planning.

Fares 
KCTA offers a variety of fare options that vary based on type of service and passenger eligibility, with reduced fares for children, senior citizens, and people with disabilities. Monthly passes are valid for 31 consecutive days from first activation, while day passes are only able to be used for one service day. Visitor passes are able to be purchased online and are able to be used for three consecutive days. Most passes are accepted across regional transit providers.

Transit hubs 
There are many Transit Centers and major Park and Rides in the RideKC service area.

Transit Centers 
 Boardwalk Square
 Antioch Center
 Independence Transit Center
 10th & Main Transit Center
 7th & Minnesota Transit Center
 Bannister & Drury Transit Center
 Mission Transit Center
 Village West Transit Center
 Blue Ridge Crossing

Major Park & Rides 
 Metro North Park & Ride
 47th & State Ave Metrocenter Park & Ride
 3rd & Grand Park & Ride
 74th Terrace & Broadway Park & Ride
 31st & Troost Park & Ride
 Oak Park Mall Park & Ride
 4th & Nelson Park & Ride
 Shawnee Station Park & Ride
 JCCC Carlesn Center Park & Ride
 KU Edwards Park & Ride
 Great Mall of the Great Plains Park & Ride

Bus rapid transit 
 
Bus rapid transit premiered with the Metro Area Express in July 2005. It is about  linking the River Market, Downtown, Crown Center and the Plaza Area. The first BRT Line is in service on Main Street. A second BRT Line is the  Troost Avenue which started service on January 1, 2011. The third BRT line is along the Prospect Ave corridor and began service in December 2019.

Bus fleet 
The RideKC Bus fleet as of February 6, 2019.

Active fleet 
40 Foot Bus Fleet

29 Foot Bus Fleet (Includes Cutaways)

References

External links 
Kansas City Area Transportation Authority official site
Smart Moves Regional Transit Plan
/ Joco Commission to end management contract with KCATA. Here’s what that means for riders 

 
United States interstate agencies
Bus transportation in Missouri
Bus transportation in Kansas
Light rail in Missouri
Light rail in Kansas
Bus rapid transit in Missouri
Bus rapid transit in Kansas
Paratransit services in the United States
Public transportation in Kansas City, Missouri
Transit agencies in Kansas
Transit agencies in Missouri